Hypena abalienalis, the white-lined hypena or white-lined bomolocha moth, is a moth of the family Erebidae. The species was first described by Francis Walker in 1859. It is found from southern Canada to northern Florida and Texas.

The wingspan is 25–33 mm. The moth flies from April to August. There are at least two generations per year.

The larvae feed on elm species, especially American elm, slippery elm, and rock elm. The caterpillar feeds on the underside of the leaves removing oval patches of tissue from the blade.

References

abalienalis
Moths of North America
Moths described in 1859